Lermontovskaya may refer to:

 Lermontovskaya (Moscow Metro)
 Lermontovskaya (Omsk Metro)